List of all acts in Norske Talenter.

Norske Talenter
Norske Talenter
Norske Talenter
Norske Talenter